Mizanur Rahman Mizan is a former association football player from Bangladesh. He played for the Bangladesh national football team from 1989 till 1997. He scored against Sri lanka during the Burma Tournament 1995 which Bangladesh won. He wore the no 10 jersey during the tournament. He started his international career during the 1989 President's Gold Cup as a member of the Bangladesh Green team.

International career

Bangladesh
Scores and results list Bangladesh's goal tally first.

International goals for club

Mohammedan SC
Scores and results list Mohammedan SC's goal tally first.

References

External links 
 

Bangladeshi footballers
Bangladesh international footballers
Living people
Year of birth missing (living people)
Association football forwards
Muktijoddha Sangsad KC players
Mohammedan SC (Dhaka) players
Brothers Union players
Abahani Limited (Dhaka) players
East Bengal Club players
Bangladeshi expatriate sportspeople in India
Bangladeshi expatriate footballers